Keeley may refer to:

People

Surname
Barbara Keeley, British Labour MP
Damian Keeley (born 1963), English professional football player
Earl Keeley (born 1936), Canadian football player
Edmund Keeley (1928–2022), American author, translator, and Professor Emeritus of English
Fred Keeley (born 1950), American politician from California; state representative
James Keeley (1867-1934), American newspaper editor and publisher
 Joseph C. Keeley (1907-1994), American American Legion magazine editor
Leslie Keeley (1836–1900), American physician, originator of the Keeley Cure
 Keeley Institute
Mary Anne Keeley (1805–1899), English actress
Robert Keeley (1793–1869), English actor and comedian
Sam Keeley (born 1990), Irish Actor
Samuel Keeley (footballer), Scottish footballer
Tom Keeley (born 1979), American guitarist
Robert Keeley, founder of Keeley Electronics

Given name
Keeley Hawes (born 1976), English actress
Keeley Hazell (born 1986), English glamour model

Other uses
Kelly pool, game also called "Keeley"

See also
Keely (disambiguation)

Anglicised Irish-language surnames